Evergreen Township may refer to:

 Evergreen Township, Montcalm County, Michigan
 Evergreen Township, Sanilac County, Michigan
 Evergreen Township, Minnesota
 Evergreen Township, Ward County, North Dakota, in Ward County, North Dakota

Township name disambiguation pages